Generides or Generydes is an English verse romance, originating in the English Midlands and dated to the end of the 14th century. It survives in two different lengthy forms. The hero Generides is born as an illegitimate son of the King of India, and after adventures marries a princess of Persia and becomes ruler of both India and Persia.

The original, which may have been in Middle English or French, appears to have been a compilation of the fourteenth century.  Despite the wide use of Eastern names and locations, these do not appear to have any particular significance, and though many analogues can (and have) been drawn between it and various Indian and Persian tales, the characters and episodes are familiar ones in medieval romances.  As in the romance Guigemar, one of the hero's parents is already married to a cruel spouse, and some of the scene suggest deliberate imitiation of that romance; as in the romance Erec, the father is woken the next morning by the lady's tears.  While as in Guigemar, the hero is identified by a trait of his garment, in Generides, the lady's tears can only be washed out by the lady herself, which suggests that poet used a fairy tale of the type of Black Bull of Norroway; magical shirts are a commonplace, but only in this romance and that tale does the detail of the heroine's ability to wash clean the shirt appear.  The lovers stay in the woods with his sword between them, which inspires their pursuer not to kill them; this is evidently imitating the scene in Tristan.

Editions
Frederick James Furnivall (1865), A royal historie of the excellent knight Generides for the Roxburghe Club
William Aldis Wright (1878), Generydes: a romance in seven-line stanzas for the Early English Text Society

Notes

External links
Middle English Compendium HyperBibliography
Generides text (W. A. Aldis edition)
Generydes a free translation and retelling in modern English of the story found in Cambridge, Trinity College Library, MS O.5.2

Romance (genre)
Middle English poems